Juna Padar was a petty princely state in the Gohelwar prant of Kathiawar. It consisted of a single village ruled by Khasia Koli chieftains.

History 
In 1901 it comprised only the single village, with a population of 193, yielding 900 rupees state revenue (1903–04, mostly from land), paying 50 rupees tribute, to the Gaekwar Baroda State and Junagadh State.

See also 
 List of Koli states and clans
 List of Koli people

References 

Princely states of Gujarat
Koli princely states